Mount Zhuoshe or Mount Cho-she is a mountain in Nantou County, Taiwan with an elevation of . It is located at the border of Ren'ai and Xinyi Township.

See also
List of mountains in Taiwan

References

External links
Mountains in Taiwan

Zhuoshe
Landforms of Nantou County